The Papaloapan chub (Notropis moralesi) is a species of ray-finned fish in the family Cyprinidae. It is found only in Mexico, and bears a Spanish name "Sardinita de Tepelmene".

Sources

 

Papaloapan chub
Endemic fish of Mexico
Freshwater fish of Mexico
Papaloapan chub
Taxonomy articles created by Polbot